Thierry Tulasne defeated Hans-Dieter Beutel in the final, 6–4, 3–6, 6–4 to win the boys' singles tennis title at the 1980 Wimbledon Championships.

Seeds

  Scott Davis (semifinals)
  Ben Testerman (semifinals)
  Thierry Tulasne (champion)
  Henri Leconte (first round)
  Sammy Giammalva (quarterfinals)
  Stefan Svensson (third round)
  Jan Gunnarsson (semifinals)
  Eric Wilborts (first round)

Draw

Finals

Top half

Section 1

Section 2

Bottom half

Section 3

Section 4

References

External links

Boys' Singles
Wimbledon Championship by year – Boys' singles